On the evening of 19 September 2017, a policeman killed three people and wounded three others during a killing spree in Paris, France.

Shootings
At about 20:45 local time in the commune of Sarcelles, in the northern suburbs of Paris, 31-year-old policeman Arnaud M. and his girlfriend were having a discussion in their car, as the woman had the intention of breaking up the relationship with the man. Suddenly, the officer pointed the gun at his girlfriend and opened fire, critically wounding her in the face. Two local men, aged 30 and 44, who were nearby at the time of the incident, intervened as they heard the gunshot. The gunman got out of the car and shot and killed the two men. He then went to the girlfriend's house, where he encountered her parents and sister. Arnaud M. opened fire again and killed the woman's father and wounded the mother and the sister. He then killed the family's pet dog and committed suicide, ending the killing spree.

References

Shooting
2017 murders in France
2017 mass shootings in Europe
September 2017 crimes in Europe
September 2017 events in France
Deaths by firearm in France
Mass shootings in France
Spree shootings in France
Murder in France
History of Val-d'Oise
Mass murder in 2017